"The Great Fire", the September 2020 issue of Vanity Fair, was guest-edited by Ta-Nehisi Coates and dedicated to topics of racial justice.

Further reading

External links 

 

Vanity Fair (magazine)
Works by Ta-Nehisi Coates